The U.S. Open Championship is an open national chess championship that has been held in the United States annually since .

History
The tournament was originally the championship of the Western Chess Association, and was called the Western Open.  In 1934 the Western Chess Association became the American Chess Federation and the tournament became the American Chess Federation congress.  In 1939, that organization merged into the United States Chess Federation (USCF) and the tournament became the U.S. Open.

In early years the tournament was usually small, and most years play was conducted as round robin.  In some years it had to be divided into preliminary and final sections.
It grew larger starting in 1934, necessitating use of different formats.  In 1946 the Swiss System was used for preliminary rounds, and in 1947 and subsequent years the tournament was held as a single section paired by the Swiss System.

For many years, the tournament had 12 or 13 rounds and lasted two weeks. After experimentation with various less-demanding formats, in recent years it has usually been nine rounds; the 2015 tournament was nine rounds in nine days.

Tournament participation grew through the 1950s and 1960s. Milwaukee 1953 had 181 entrants, setting a new record for the tournament.  Cleveland 1957 had 184 players, and San Francisco 1961 set another attendance record with 198 players. The 1963 Open at Chicago had 266 entries, making it the largest chess tournament held in the United States to that time. The tourney was slightly smaller at Boston in 1964, with a field of 229.

The 1983 Open at Pasadena was the largest ever, at 836 official entries; it also featured the participation of Viktor Korchnoi, who had played in the last two World Championship matches.

In the 2000s, the fields were over 400 to 500 entries. The tournament began in some editions to decline both in attendance and importance, and often many winners are involved in a tie for first, especially since the mid 1990s.

The cash prizes awarded were large for their time and added to the tournament's popularity. In 1962, the entry fee was $20, with a first prize of $1,000, second prize $500, third $300, fourth $200, fifth $100, sixth through tenth $50 and eleventh through fifteenth $25. The Women's Open Champion won $200, and the women's runner-up $100. Additional cash prizes were awarded to the top women, the top junior, and for the best scores in the Expert, A, B, and C classes. The 2016 guaranteed prize fund was $40,000, with $8,000 for first place.

Winners
{|
! No. !! Year !! Location !! Champions
|-
|   1 || 1900 || Excelsior, Minnesota || Louis Uedemann
|-
|   2 || 1901 || Excelsior, Minnesota || Nicholas MacLeod
|-
|   3 || 1902 || Excelsior, Minnesota || Louis Uedemann
|-
|   4 || 1903 || Chicago || Max Judd
|-
|   5 || 1904 || St. Louis, Missouri || Stasch Mlotkowski
|-
|   6 || 1905 || Excelsior, Minnesota || Edward F. Schrader
|-
|   7 || 1906 || Chicago || George H. Wolbrecht
|-
|   8 || 1907 || Excelsior, Minnesota || Einar Michelsen
|-
|   9 || 1908 || Excelsior, Minnesota || Edward P. Elliot
|-
|  10 || 1909 || Excelsior, Minnesota || Oscar Chajes
|-
|  11 || 1910 || Chicago || George. H. Wolbrecht
|-
|  12 || 1911 || Excelsior, Minnesota || Charles Blake
|-
|  13 || 1912 || Excelsior, Minnesota || Edward P. Elliot
|-
|  14 || 1913 || Chicago || Bradford B. Jefferson
|-
|  15 || 1914 || Memphis, Tennessee || Bradford B. Jefferson
|-
|  16 || 1915 || Excelsior, Minnesota || Jackson Showalter
|-
|  17 || 1916 || Chicago || Edward Lasker
|-
|  18 || 1917 || Lexington, Kentucky || Edward Lasker
|-
|  19 || 1918 || Chicago || Bora Kostić
|-
|  20 || 1919 || Cincinnati || Edward Lasker
|-
|  21 || 1920 || Memphis, Tennessee || Edward Lasker
|-
|  22 || 1921 || Cleveland, Ohio || Edward Lasker
|-
|  23 || 1922 || Louisville, Kentucky || Samuel Factor
|-
|  24 || 1923 || San Francisco || Stasch Mlotkowski, Norman Whitaker
|-
|  25 || 1924 || Detroit || Carlos Torre
|-
|  26 || 1925 || Cedar Point, Ohio || Abraham Kupchik
|-
|  27 || 1926 || Chicago || Leon Stolzenberg
|-
|  28 || 1927 || Kalamazoo, Michigan || Albert Charles Margolis
|-
|  29 || 1928 || South Bend, Indiana || Leon Stolzenberg
|-
|  30 || 1929 || St. Louis, Missouri || Herman H. Hahlbohm
|-
|  31 || 1930 || Chicago || Samuel Factor, Norman Whitaker
|-
|  32 || 1931 || Tulsa, Oklahoma || Samuel Reshevsky
|-
|  33 || 1932 || Minneapolis || Reuben Fine
|-
|  34 || 1933 || Detroit || Reuben Fine
|-
|  35 || 1934 || Chicago || Reuben Fine, Samuel Reshevsky
|-
|  36 || 1935 || Milwaukee || Reuben Fine
|-
|  37 || 1936 || Philadelphia || Israel A. Horowitz
|-
|  38 || 1937 || Chicago || David Polland
|-
|  39 || 1938 || Boston || Israel A. Horowitz, Isaac Kashdan
|-
|  40 || 1939 || New York City || Reuben Fine
|-
|  41 || 1940 || Dallas || Reuben Fine
|-
|  42 || 1941 || St. Louis, Missouri || Reuben Fine
|-
|  43 || 1942 || Dallas || Herman Steiner, Daniel Yanofsky
|-
|  44 || 1943 || Syracuse, New York || Israel A. Horowitz
|-
|  45 || 1944 || Boston || Samuel Reshevsky
|-
|  46 || 1945 || Peoria, Illinois || Anthony Santasiere
|-
|  47 || 1946 || Pittsburgh || Herman Steiner
|-
|  48 || 1947 || Corpus Christi, Texas || Isaac Kashdan
|-
|  49 || 1948 || Baltimore || Weaver W. Adams
|-
|  50 || 1949 || Omaha, Nebraska || Albert Sandrin Jr.
|-
|  51 || 1950 || Detroit || Arthur Bisguier
|-
|  52 || 1951 || Fort Worth, Texas || Larry Evans
|-
|  53 || 1952 || Tampa, Florida || Larry Evans
|-
|  54 || 1953 || Milwaukee || Donald Byrne
|-
|  55 || 1954 || New Orleans || Larry Evans, Arturo Pomar
|-
|  56 || 1955 || Long Beach, California || Nicolas Rossolimo, Samuel Reshevsky (Rossolimo awarded title on tie-break)
|-
|  57 || 1956 || Oklahoma City || Arthur Bisguier
|-
|  58 || 1957 || Cleveland, Ohio || Bobby Fischer, Arthur Bisguier (Fischer awarded title on tie-break)
|-
|  59 || 1958 || Rochester, Minnesota || Eldis Cobo Arteaga
|-
|  60 || 1959 || Omaha, Nebraska || Arthur Bisguier
|-
|  61 || 1960 || St. Louis, Missouri || Robert Byrne
|-
|  62 || 1961 || San Francisco || Pal Benko
|-
|  63 || 1962 || San Antonio, Texas || Antonio Medina Garcia
|-
|  64 || 1963 || Chicago || William Lombardy, Robert Byrne
|-
|  65 || 1964 || Boston || Pal Benko
|-
|  66 || 1965 || Río Piedras, Puerto Rico || Pal Benko, William Lombardy
|-
|  67 || 1966 || Seattle || Pal Benko, Robert Byrne
|-
|  68 || 1967 || Atlanta || Pal Benko
|-
|  69 || 1968 || Aspen, Colorado || Bent Larsen
|-
|  70 || 1969 || Lincoln, Nebraska || Pal Benko, Arthur Bisguier, Milan Vukcevich
|-
|  71 || 1970 || Boston || Bent Larsen
|-
|  72 || 1971 || Ventura, California || Walter Browne, Larry Evans
|-
|  73 || 1972 || Atlantic City, New Jersey || Walter Browne
|-
|  74 || 1973 || Chicago || Norman Weinstein, Duncan Suttles, Walter Browne,Greg DeFotis, Ruben Rodríguez (Weinstein awarded title on tie-break)
|-
|  75 || 1974 || New York City || Pal Benko, Vlastimil Hort
|-
|  76 || 1975 || Lincoln, Nebraska || Pal Benko, William Lombardy
|-
|  77 || 1976 || Fairfax, Virginia || Anatoly Lein, Leonid Shamkovich
|-
|  78 || 1977 || Columbus, Ohio || Leonid Shamkovich, Andy Soltis, Timothy Taylor
|-
|  79 || 1978 || Phoenix, Arizona || Joseph Bradford
|-
|  80 || 1979 || Chicago || Florin Gheorghiu
|-
|  81 || 1980 || Atlanta || John Fedorowicz, Florin Gheorghiu
|-
|  82 || 1981 || Palo Alto, California || Florin Gheorghiu, Larry Christiansen, Jeremy Silman,Nick de Firmian, John Meyer
|-
|  83 || 1982 || St. Paul, Minnesota || Andrew Soltis, William Martz
|-
|  84 || 1983 || Pasadena, California || Larry Christiansen, Viktor Korchnoi
|-
|  85 || 1984 || Ft. Worth, Texas || Roman Dzindzichashvili, Sergey Kudrin
|-
|  86 || 1985 || Hollywood, Florida || Yasser Seirawan, Boris Spassky, Joel Benjamin
|-
|  87 || 1986 || Somerset, New Jersey || Larry Christiansen
|-
|  88 || 1987 || Portland, Oregon || Lev Alburt
|-
|  89 || 1988 || Boston || Dmitry Gurevich
|-
|  90 || 1989 || Chicago || Lev Alburt
|-
|  91 || 1990 || Jacksonville, Florida || Yasser Seirawan
|-
|  92 || 1991 || Los Angeles || Michael Rohde, Vladimir Akopian
|-
|  93 || 1992 || Dearborn, Michigan || Gregory Kaidanov
|-
|  94 || 1993 || Philadelphia || Alexander Shabalov
|-
|  95 || 1994 || Chicago || Georgi Orlov, Dmitry Gurevich, Ben Finegold,Smbat Lputian, Leo Kaushansky, Albert Chow
|-
|  96 || 1995 || Concord, California || Alex Yermolinsky
|-
|  97 || 1996 || Alexandria, Virginia || Gabriel Schwartzman
|-
|  98 || 1997 || Kissimmee, Florida || Alex Yermolinsky
|-
|  99 || 1998 || Kailua-Kona, Hawaii || Judit Polgár, Boris Gulko
|-
| 100 || 1999 || Reno, Nevada || Alex Yermolinsky, Alexander Goldin, Eduardas Rozentalis,Alexander Shabalov, Gabriel Schwartzman, Michael Mulyar
|-
| 101 || 2000 || St. Paul, Minnesota || Alex Yermolinsky
|-
| 102 || 2001 || Framingham, Massachusetts || Aleksander Wojtkiewicz, Joel Benjamin,Alexander Stripunsky, Fabian Doettling
|-
| 103 || 2002 || Cherry Hill, New Jersey || Gennadi Zaichik, Evgeniy Najer
|-
| 104 || 2003 || Los Angeles || Alexander Shabalov
|-
| 105 || 2004 || Ft. Lauderdale, Florida || Alexander Onischuk, Rodrigo Vásquez, Aleksander Wojtkiewicz,Ildar Ibragimov, Renier González, Marcel Martinez
|-
| 106 || 2005 || Phoenix, Arizona || Vadim Milov, Joel Benjamin
|-
| 107 || 2006 || Oak Brook, Illinois || Yury Shulman
|-
| 108 || 2007 || Cherry Hill, New Jersey || Boris Gulko, Sergey Kudrin, Benjamin Finegold, Alexander Shabalov,Michael A. Rohde, Michael A. Mulyar, Anton Paolo Del Mundo
|-
| 109 || 2008 || Dallas || Alexander Shabalov, Rade Milovanović, Enrico Sevillano
|-
| 110 || 2009 || Indianapolis || Dmitry Gurevich, Sergey Kudrin, Alex Lenderman, Alex Yermolinsky, Jacek Stopa, Jesse Kraai
|-
| 111 || 2010 || Irvine, California || Alejandro Ramirez
|-
| 112 || 2011 || Orlando, Florida || Aleksandr Lenderman
|-
| 113 || 2012 || Vancouver, Washington || Manuel León Hoyos, Dmitry Gurevich, John Daniel Bryant
|-
|| 114 || 2013 || Middleton, Wisconsin || Josh Friedel, Mackenzie Molner, Julio Sadorra
|-
| 115 || 2014 || Orlando, Florida || Conrad Holt
|-
| 116 || 2015 || Phoenix, Arizona || Alexander Shabalov
|-
| 117 || 2016 || Indianapolis, Indiana || Alexander Shabalov
|-
| 118 || 2017 || Norfolk, Virginia || Aleksandr Lenderman
|-
| 119 || 2018 || Middleton, Wisconsin || Timur Gareyev
|-
| 120 || 2019 || Orlando, Florida || Illia Nyzhnyk
|-
| 121 || 2021 || Cherry Hill, New Jersey || Aleksandr Lenderman
|-
| 122 || 2022 ||  Rancho Mirage, California || Aleksey Sorokin
|}

See also
U.S. Women's Open Chess Championship
U.S. Women's Chess Championship
U.S. Chess Championship
American Chess Congress

References
 (History and winners list of the tournament through 1966.)
 McCrary, John. "Early Predecessors of the U.S. Chess Federation". World Chess Hall of Fame. Retrieved February 22, 2023.
  (winners list)
  (winners and location list 1939-1979)
 
  (details of the 1962 Open)
2007 results at uschess.org

Chess competitions
Chess in the United States
1900 establishments in Minnesota
Recurring events established in 1900
1900 in chess